The German Speedway Team Championships are an annual motorcycle speedway events held each year organized by the Deutscher Motor Sport Bund.

Past winners

Team 
East Germany (1965-1990)

West Germany (1973-1991)

Individual

Individual U-21

Ice speedway

Long track

See also 
 Germany national speedway team
 Speedway Grand Prix of Germany

References 

Speedway competitions in Germany